Comanche Territory may refer to:

 Comanche Territory (1950 film), a 1950 American Western
 Comanche Territory (1997 film), a 1997 Spanish drama set in Bosnia
 Comanchería, the Spanish name for the territory controlled by the Comanche people during the late 18th and early 19th centuries